Frank D. Baker (October 10, 1852 – June 6, 1927) was a Michigan politician.  He was an active member in the Odd Fellows, Masons, and Knights of the Maccabees.

Early life
Born near Biddeford, Devonshire, England on  October 10, 1852, Frank D. Baker came to Flint, Michigan by the way of Quebec, Canada in 1856. He graduated from Flint High School in 1872. He then taught school for a while with a one-year stint in La Grange, Illinois. Attending the University of Michigan, he first majored in Literary then after a year switch to the Medicine school in 1877. After graduating in 1880, he set up a practice in Tuscola County, Michigan then for a short time in Edwardsville, Illinois. Returning to the area in 1881, Baker bought a farm in Clayton Township and started the pharmaceutical firm of Miller & Baker. In 1989 the drug business was sold. He also was involved in the real estate business.

Political life
Baker was elected as an Alderman then as the Mayor of the City of Flint in 1889 for a single 1-year term.  Then he was elected Sheriff of Genesee County in 1891.

Post-political life
Upon his death on June 6, 1927, he was buried in Evergreen Cemetery, Grand Blanc.

References

1852 births
1927 deaths
American Freemasons
Mayors of Flint, Michigan
Michigan sheriffs
University of Michigan Medical School alumni
Burials in Michigan
19th-century American politicians